INSAT-1C was the third in the first generation INSAT series of satellites (termed as INSAT-1) built by Ford Aerospace to satisfy the domestic communication requirement of India. The Govt. agencies using its services were All India Radio, Doordarshan, Department of Space and Indian Meteorological Department

Launch
INSAT-1C was launched from Guiana Space Centre in Kourou using Ariane 3 rocket on July 21, 1988. The satellite was positioned at 93.5° East longitude in geostationary orbit

Payloads
INSAT-1C carried 3 payloads on board to provide communication services to Indian Meteorological Department, Department of Telecommunications and Department of Space:
Very High Resolution scanning Radiometer (VHRR)
12 transponders operating in 2-phases (earth-to-satellite and vice versa).
Data channel to send data for land based applications.

Mission
INSAT-1C mission was a success and lasted for about 13 years because the satellite got another 6 C-band transponders and 2 S-band transponders when a power system made one 
more bus

See also

1988 in spaceflight

References

External links 
 isro.org : INSAT-1C

INSAT satellites
Spacecraft launched in 1988
Ariane commercial payloads
1988 in India